Paraisópolis is a city in Minas Gerais, Brazil, with a population (2020) of 21,221.

The municipality contains part of the  Fernão Dias Environmental Protection Area, created in 1997.

References 

Municipalities in Minas Gerais